G∞ver is the debut album by High and Mighty Color. The album was released in Japan on September 14, 2005, following four supporting singles. It was later released by Tofu Records in the United States on March 21, 2006.

Overview 
G∞ver is currently High and Mighty Color's highest selling album. Released just eight months after their debut single, this album was more on the pop side of music rather than the rock side, which their first two singles had showcased. According to an interview with Tofu Records, drummer Sassy revealed that the original version of "Notice" was accidentally deleted, forcing them to record the entire song all over again. Despite this, Sassy states that the re-recorded version exceeded the original with "great groovy sounds".

Track listing

Personnel
 Mākii – vocals
 Yuusuke – vocals
 Meg – guitars
 Kazuto – guitars
 Sassy – drums
 Mackaz – bass

Charts

Album - Oricon Sales Chart (Japan)

Singles - Oricon Sales Chart (Japan)

References

High and Mighty Color albums
2005 debut albums